is a Japanese politician who was mayor of Kyoto from 1996 to 2008. A graduate of Chuo University, he was first elected in February 1996. After three full terms in office he did not run again in the 2008 mayoral election.

References 
 
 

Mayors of Kyoto
Chuo University alumni
1941 births
Living people